Grontmij was an engineering consultancy based in the Netherlands. The company was the third largest of its kind in Europe, with approximately 6,000 employees and almost 300 offices across the continent and a further 50 offices globally. In 2015 the company was acquired by Sweco AB.

History 
In 1913 Doedo Veenhuizen, a farmer by trade, started a company focusing on cultivating wasteland, helping farmers protect against flooding and reclaiming land. In 1915 the company was founded as an N.V. (a form of Limited Liability Company in the Netherlands).  While business expanded, Grontmij is still active in its core business of land reclamation and cultivation. The name 'Grontmij' originates from the letters in the Dutch words for soil improvement (GRondverbetering) and reclamation company (ONTginningMaatschappIJ).

In 2015 the company was acquired by Sweco AB. Sweco is Europe's leading architecture and engineering consultancy, with sales of approximately SEK 15.2 billion (EUR 1.7 billion) (pro forma 2014). The company is listed on NASDAQ OMX Stockholm AB.

Expansion 
Grontmij has grown both organically and through acquisitions. In August 2006, Grontmij acquired the Carl Bro Group which meant the company doubled in size. In June 2010 Grontmij acquired the French engineering company Ginger Groupe and added a fourth business line, Monitoring & Testing. With the French acquisition, Grontmij operates in four regions, namely: Benelux, France, Nordic, United Kingdom and Central & Eastern Europe.

Organisation  

Grontmij operates in four business lines and four regions. The four business lines reflect the division of professional services for specific market segments.

Countries

Grontmij has offices in the following countries:

Afghanistan, Algeria, Belgium, Bulgaria, Cameroon, Central African Republic, China, Congo, Czech Republic, Denmark, Dominican Republic, Ethiopia, Germany, Guinea, Hong Kong, Hungary, India, Indonesia, Ireland, Japan, Jordan, Kenya, Latvia, Lebanon, Lithuania, Madagascar, Malaysia, Mali, Martinique, Mayotte, Moldova, Netherlands, New Caledonia, Norway, Pakistan, Poland, Polynesia, Qatar, Reunion Island, Romania, Russia, Saudi Arabia, Senegal, Singapore, Sweden, Tanzania, Turkey, Uganda, United Arab Emirates, United Kingdom, United States, Vietnam.

References

External links 
 Grontmij N.V.

Companies based in Utrecht (province)
Engineering consulting firms